This is a list of notable companies based in the city of Cluj-Napoca, Romania.

Astral 
Banca Transilvania (together with BT Asigurări, BT Asset Management, BT Leasing, BT Securities and BT Direct) 
Dico și Țigănaș
Jolidon
Napolact
Nisco Invest Cluj
Sanex
Terapia
Ursus 
   

Companies based in Cluj-Napoca